In computational chemistry, orbital-free density functional theory is a quantum mechanical approach to electronic structure determination which is based on functionals of the electronic density. It is most closely related to the Thomas–Fermi model. Orbital-free density functional theory is, at present, less accurate than Kohn–Sham density functional theory models, but has the advantage of being fast, so that it can be applied to large systems.

Kinetic energy of electrons

The Hohenberg–Kohn theorems guarantee that, for a system of atoms, there exists a functional of the electron density that yields the total energy. Minimization of this functional with respect to the density gives the ground-state density from which all of the system's properties can be obtained. Although the Hohenberg–Kohn theorems tell us that such a functional exists, they do not give us guidance on how to find it. In practice, the density functional is known exactly except for two terms. These are the electronic kinetic energy and the exchange–correlation energy. The lack of the true exchange–correlation functional is a well known problem in DFT, and there exists a huge variety of approaches to approximate this crucial component.

In general, there is no known form for the interacting kinetic energy in terms of electron density. In practice, instead of deriving approximations for interacting kinetic energy, much effort was devoted to deriving approximations for non-interacting (Kohn–Sham) kinetic energy, which is defined as (in atomic units)

 

where  is the i-th Kohn–Sham orbital. The summation is performed over all the occupied Kohn–Sham orbitals. One of the first attempts to do this (even before the formulation of the Hohenberg–Kohn theorem) was the Thomas–Fermi model, which wrote the kinetic energy as

 

This expression is based on the homogeneous electron gas and, thus, is not very accurate for most physical systems. Finding more accurate and transferable kinetic-energy density functionals is the focus of ongoing research. By formulating Kohn–Sham kinetic energy in terms of electron density, one avoids diagonalizing the Kohn–Sham Hamiltonian for solving for the Kohn–Sham orbitals, therefore saving the computational cost. Since no Kohn–Sham orbital is involved in orbital-free density functional theory, one only needs to minimize the system's energy with respect to the electron density.

References

Density functional theory
Computational chemistry